Millers Dale railway station was situated in Millers Dale, near Tideswell, in the Peak District.

History
It was built in 1863 by the Midland Railway on its extension of the Manchester, Buxton, Matlock and Midlands Junction Railway from Rowsley.

It served an important junction where passengers for Buxton joined or left the trains between London and Manchester. It was originally to be called "Blackwell Mill" but, in the end, was named "Millers Dale for Tideswell". For such a rural location, it was unusually large; indeed, it was one of the largest stations on the line and was one of the few stations in England to have a post office on the platform. Millers Dale also sent dairy, agricultural and quarried products from the surrounding areas to the major cities.  While also serving local towns and villages (notably Tideswell, Taddington and Wormhill), much of its activity was concerned with the connecting service to and from Buxton. Traffic for Buxton actually followed the main line north for nearly two miles, before diverging at Millers Dale Junction, beside Blackwell Mill Halt.

Changing at Millers Dale often involved a wait and the High Peak News of November 1900 referred to the station as "Patience Junction".
The station was later immortalised in the 1964 song "Slow Train" by Flanders and Swann.

The station closed in 1967, but trains continued to pass through until 1968, when the line was closed.

Stationmasters

T. Turner 1863 - 1864 (afterwards station master at Kibworth)
W. Fry 1864 - 1865 
W. Palmer from 1865  (formerly station master at Brightside)
H. Lewis until 1872 (afterwards station master at Ripple)
W. Whitmore from 1872  - 1898
Joseph Henry Clarke 1898 - 1904 (afterwards station master at Matlock Bridge)
W.E Coates 1905 - 1908 (afterwards station master at Kegworth)
John Alderson 1908 - 1920 (afterwards station master at Skipton)
A. Foster ca. 1937

Route

Platforms

Built on a shelf carved out of the hillside, Millers Dale station originally had two platforms, but a bay platform was added in 1905 to accommodate Buxton trains, plus the down platform became an island platform to serve the extra tracks. The new loop and the second (northerly) viaduct were opened on 20 August 1905. The old viaduct was then closed, strengthened and reopened in April 1906.  Whilst the piers for the two viaducts are identical, the older viaduct is supported by an arch structure, whereas the later one is a box structure.
  
Part of the original Parliamentary Act approving the line considered the needs of invalids taking the waters at Buxton and so, for a while, 'through' carriages for Buxton were attached to, and detached from, expresses, thus alleviating the problem of changing trains. In addition, the two main platforms were connected by a subway.

Since closure
Since the railway was closed the station has become a car park serving the Monsal Trail, an  walking and cycle track, under the management of the Peak District National Park Authority, who took on the trail and associated infrastructure in the early 1980s.

The main buildings remain, now acting as a café and visitor information point, public toilets and exhibition. The station waiting area and booking office was re-opened as a cafe now known as the Refreshment Rooms in 2019, following an extensive £230,000 restoration led by the National Park Authority. In 2022 the former goods shed re-opened after a £330,000 EU-funded restoration and now includes a self-guided interpretive and information exhibition open at all times when the café is in operation. 

The hamlet of Millers Dale is still dominated by the two large disused viaducts over the Wye valley, the older of which became part of the Monsal Trail.

See also

 Cycleways in England

References

External links

 Ingenious.org Millers Dale Viaduct, 1892
 "Picture the Past" Midland railway station 1964
 Disused stations: Millers Dale
 Millers Dale station on navigable 1947 O. S. map

Former Midland Railway stations
Railway stations in Great Britain opened in 1863
Railway stations in Great Britain closed in 1967
Disused railway stations in Derbyshire
Beeching closures in England